is the nickname for the high-speed test trains that are used on the Tokaido Shinkansen and San'yō Shinkansen. (On Shinkansen lines operated by the East Japan Railway Company (JR East), there is an equivalent called East i.)
The trains have special equipment on board to monitor the condition of the track and overhead wire, including special instrumented bogies and observation blisters.

The "Doctor" part of the name is from their test and diagnostic function, and the "Yellow" part comes from the bright yellow color they are all painted. Some have a blue waistline stripe, some a green one. The original color scheme of yellow with a blue stripe (applied to the Class 921 track-recording cars) was created by reversing the colors (blue with yellow stripe) used on  narrow-gauge track-recording cars.

List of Doctor Yellow trains past and present

For Tōkaidō and Sanyō Shinkansen 
 Non-powered track recording cars (Yellow with blue stripe):
 921-1: Built in 1962 (initially numbered 4001), and withdrawn in 1980.
 921-2: Converted in 1964 from former MaRoNeFu 29-11 sleeping car, and withdrawn in 1976.
 0 series type (Yellow with blue stripe):
 922-0 (Set T1): 4-car set converted in 1964 from the prototype set (class 1000 Set B) built in 1961, and withdrawn in 1976.
 922-10 (Set T2): 7-car set owned by JR Central. Built in 1974 and withdrawn in 2001.
 922-20 (Set T3): 7-car set owned by JR West. Built in 1979 and withdrawn in 2005.
 700 series type (Yellow with blue stripe):
 923 (Set T4): 7-car set owned by JR Central. Delivered in 2000.
 923-3000 (Set T5): 7-car set owned by JR West. Delivered in 2005.

For Tōhoku, Jōetsu, Hokuriku, Yamagata, and Akita Shinkansen 
 200 series type (Yellow with green stripe):
 925/0 (Set S1): 7-car set owned by JR East. Delivered in 1979 and withdrawn in 2001.
 925/10 (Set S2): 7-car set owned by JR East. Converted from former Class 962 test train in 1982 and withdrawn in 2002.
 E3 series type (White with red stripe)
 E926 (Set S51): "East i" 6-car set owned by JR East. Delivered in August 2001.

Interior (Class 923)

Preserved examples

 922-26 (ex-set T3, built 1979 by Hitachi) at SCMaglev and Railway Park, Nagoya, since March 2011

In popular culture 

Seeing as the schedule for this train is not made public, sighting is based purely on luck. It is therefore considered to bring good luck to anyone fortunate enough see it in operation.

See also 
 Comprehensive Inspection Train, used to evaluate the condition of the China Railway High-speed network.
New Measurement Train, the British equivalent of Doctor Yellow, used to assess the condition of track
 TGV Iris 320, the French counterpart of Doctor Yellow, used to monitor the condition of the French tracks (mainly the high-speed railways LGV) used by high-speed trains.

References

External links

Shinkansen train series
Non-passenger multiple units
Track recording trains